Reggae rock is a subgenre of reggae fusion and rock music that primarily uses the genres reggae, rock, and ska. Typical lyrics of reggae rock songs incorporate love, personal awareness, and life challenges while incorporating music and beat elements of rock, punk, and hip-hop. The term "reggae rock" has been used to categorize bands like the Police, Men at Work, Sublime, Sublime with Rome, Pepper, Slightly Stoopid, the Expendables, Iration, the Dirty Heads, Rebelution, 311 and, to some extent, heavier bands such as Fishbone and Bad Brains.

Among the earliest examples of the genre are the 1972 songs "D'yer Mak'er" by English rock band Led Zeppelin and "C Moon" by Paul McCartney and Wings.

The term "reggae metal" has been used to describe bands that combine reggae rock with heavy metal, such as Dub War, Shinobi Ninja, Skindred, Twelve Foot Ninja, and Zeroscape. Reggae rock found its rise in popularity in the 1990s in Long Beach, California, with the band Sublime. The genre has lately found a boost in popularity with the 2010 song "Lay Me Down" by the Dirty Heads featuring Rome Ramirez from Sublime with Rome, which peaked at number 1 on both the US Billboard Alternative Songs and Rock Songs charts.

With reggae rock rising in popularity, the genre was included in the inaugural California Roots Music & Arts Festival in 2010.

References

 
Fusion music genres
British rock music genres
American rock music genres